The Big Beat is a remix album by Australian synthpop band Machinations. The album is a collection of 12" mixes and was released in May 1986 on White Label Records a subsidiary of Mushroom Records. The album peaked at number 83 on the Australian Kent Music Report.

Track listing

Charts

References

1986 remix albums
Machinations (band) albums
Mushroom Records albums
Remix albums by Australian artists